Children of the Revolution is a 1996 Australian black comedy film, depicting Joseph Stalin and his son's somewhat deterministic path into The Revolution in modern-day Australia.  It stars Richard Roxburgh Judy Davis, Geoffrey Rush, Sam Neill, and F. Murray Abraham as Joseph Stalin.

Plot
Joan (Judy Davis) is a young Australian communist who goes to the Soviet Union as part of a work study program in the 1950s.  There she catches the eye of Soviet dictator Joseph Stalin (F. Murray Abraham) and the two sleep together just before Stalin dies.  Returning to Australia, Joan discovers she is pregnant and gives birth to Stalin's love child, whom she names Joe (Richard Roxburgh).  Her son (who does not know who his father is) has a troubled upbringing, rebelling against both his mother's left wing politics and Australian society in general.  He spends time in jail where he learns about Stalin's crimes from a fellow inmate.  Upon release, he marries Anna (Rachel Griffiths) a police officer who had arrested him.  She is the child of Latvian refugees who fled to Australia to escape Stalin's Great Purge.  Pledging to go on the straight and narrow, Joe rises to become the head of Australia's police union and seizes more and more political power.  Anna learns of Joe's true parentage, but keeps this secret from Joe out of love and a conviction that she cannot truly know for certain.  The secret eats at their relationship and Joe resents the secrecy when it is revealed.

Cast
 Judy Davis as Joan
 Sam Neill as Nine
 F. Murray Abraham as Joseph Stalin
 Richard Roxburgh as Joe
 Rachel Griffiths as Anna
 Geoffrey Rush as Welch
 Russell Kiefel as Barry Rogers
 John Gaden as Professor C.W. 'Wilf' Wilke
 Ben McIvor as Joe – 8 Years
 Marshall Napier as Brendan Shaw
 Ken Radley as Bernard Shaw
 Fiona Press as Mavis Craig
 Alex Menglet as Yuri Nikolayev
 Rowan Woods as Col Slansky
 Barry Langrishe as Ted
 Ron Haddrick as Sir Allan Miles
 Graham Ware Jr. as Harry
 Robbie McGregor as Minister Frank
 Heather Mitchell as Mrs. Savage
 Paul Livingston as Beria
 Dennis Watkins as Khrushchev
 Steve Abbott as Malenkov (as Steve Abbott)
 Matt Potter as Tommy Booth
 Harold Hopkins as Police Commissioner
 Sam Willcock as Ivan
 Roy Billing as Police Sergeant
 Philip Dodd as Policeman Brian
 Paul Lyneham as himself
 Mikhail Gorbachev (archive footage) as himself
 Václav Havel (archive footage) as himself
 Ronald Reagan (archive footage) as himself
 Joseph Stalin (archive footage) as himself

Production
The film was inspired in part by Peter Duncan's grandfather, who was a long-standing member of the Communist Party. He wrote the script to help him get into the Australian Film Television and Radio School and showed it to Tristram Miall after he graduated; the producer loved it and decided to turn it into a film.

Critical reception

The film holds a rating of 80% on Rotten Tomatoes, based on 20 reviews, with an average rating of 6.6/10. The website Metacritic gave the film a score of 76/100.

See also
 Cinema of Australia

References

External links
 
 
 
 
Children of the Revolution at Oz Movies

Australian satirical films
1990s black comedy films
1996 films
Australian black comedy films
Films about Joseph Stalin
1990s mockumentary films
Australian political satire films
Films scored by Nigel Westlake
Miramax films
Films shot in New South Wales
Films shot in Sydney
Films set in the Soviet Union
Films set in Sydney
1996 comedy films
1990s English-language films